The Owen Chapel Church of Christ is a property in Brentwood, Tennessee that was built c. 1860 and that was listed on the National Register of Historic Places in 1986.  It includes Greek Revival and "Vernacular Greek Revival" architecture.

As of 1988, it was one of only two brick churches in Williamson County that were built before the American Civil War and survived, besides churches in the city of Franklin.  The other one outside of Franklin, the Harpeth Presbyterian Church, had been extensively altered and was not eligible for NRHP listing.

See also
St. Paul's Episcopal Church (Franklin, Tennessee), NRHP-listed, a fine church architecturally

References

Churches on the National Register of Historic Places in Tennessee
Churches in Williamson County, Tennessee
Greek Revival church buildings in Tennessee
Churches completed in 1860
Restoration Movement
National Register of Historic Places in Williamson County, Tennessee